Procyon is the name of the brightest star in the constellation of Canis Minor.

Procyon may also refer to:
 Procyon (genus), a genus of nocturnal mammals commonly known as raccoons.
 USS Procyon, the name of several U.S. ships.
 Procyon Peaks, a pair of mountains in Antarctica.
 PROCYON, a spacecraft that was intended to perform an asteroid fly-by.